The 2006–07 Libyan Premier League was the 39th edition of The Libyan Premier League, the highest division of Libyan football championship, organised by Libyan Football Federation.

Competition
There were 14 clubs in the League for this season. During the course of the season each club plays each other home and away, for a total of 26 games. However, after Al Charara had all of its matches canceled by the LFF, all teams played 24 games. At the end of season, the lowest two placed teams were automatically relegated to the Libyan Second Division, with the winner of the LSD automatically taking its place. However, because of the troubles of Al Charara, three clubs were promoted from the Second Division for 2007/2008

Teams

Final standings

References

External links
RSSSF overview
KOOORA

Libyan Premier League
Libyan Premier League seasons
1